Jotunheimvegen is a  long toll road through Jotunheimen in Innlandet county in Norway which is only open in the summer, from the end of June until it starts to snow, generally in October. It is a gravel road.

Route
The road goes from Skåbu to Finnbolslia as Slangslivegen and crosses the Flekka river, where the name changes to Jotunheimvegen. It crosses the mountain plateau then approximately follows the northern shores of the lakes Sandvatnet and Vinstri until the road RV 51 near where the lake Bygdin flows into Vinstri. 

From the eastern terminus, on the opposite side of the Olstappen lake is the Peer Gynt tourist road to Lillehammer. Nearby is also the Ormtjernkampen National Park.

History

Jotunheimvegen was constructed in the 1950s to replace a milk boat service which operated across Sandvatnet and Vinstri. The boat service became untenable due to the development of the lakes for hydroelectricity. The early formation of the road had to cross boggy areas and was laid on birch branches to prevent the construction vehicles from sinking. This made the road expensive to maintain and by 1987, after continual weather damage, the road needed reconstruction. With the support of private finance, toll income and a grant from the Nord-Fron municipality, it was brought up to a good standard at a cost of NOK 10 million. It is maintained by toll income, as of 2021 the toll for a single journey by car was NOK 100.

References

External links 
 Jotunheimvegen website

Roads in Innlandet